Geoffrey James  (born 1942 in St. Asaph, Wales) is a Canadian photographer, living in Toronto. His black-and-white panoramic landscapes of the built landscape explore the relationship between human society and its surroundings.

Life and work 
James began his working career as a journalist. He moved to Canada in 1966, working for Time magazine in Montreal. He moved into arts administration in 1975, working for the Canada Council in Ottawa. In the mid 1970s, he began to take photography more seriously and by 1982, when he left the Canada Council, he was exhibiting his photography regularly.

James works in series and much of his photography is available as books.
 La Campagna Romana, 1991
 The Italiin Garden, 1991
 Viewing Olmsted: Photographs by Robert Burley, Lee Friedlander, and Geoffrey James, 1997
 Geoffrey James: Running Fence, 1999
 Paris: Photographs by Geoffrey James, 2001
 Geoffrey James; Parks and Walkways of Oshawa, 2001
 Place, 2002
 Geoffrey James: Past/Present/Future, 2003
 Une Mort Très Digne: L'Histoire Du Cimetière Mont-Royal, 2003
 Toronto, 2006
 Utopia Dystopia, 2008
 Geoffrey James: Field Notes, 2008
A retrospective of his work, Utopia/Dystopia: The Photographs of Geoffrey James was mounted by the National Gallery of Canada in 2008. Between 1987 and 2002, he used large-format and panoramic film cameras to record landscape that has felt the impact of human activity. The earlier work examined idealized landscapes of pleasure gardens followed by an exploration of asbestos mining sites and the US/Mexico border fence in southern California.

Honours 
 Governor General's Awards in Visual and Media Arts, 2012
 Fellow of the Graham Foundation for Advanced Studies in the Fine Arts, Chicago
 Fellow of the John Simon Guggenheim Foundation, New York
 Victor Lynch Staunton Prize, Canada Council
 Roloff Beny Foundation Photography Book Award
 Gershon Iskowitz Foundation Prize
 Royal Canadian Academy of Arts

References

External links
 Trépanier Baer Gallery: Geoffrey James
 Equinox Gallery: Geoffrey James
 National Gallery of Canada: Geoffrey James
 Toronto photographer Geoffrey James among Governor General visual and media arts award winners
 Governor General's Awards in Visual and Media Arts: "Geoffrey James: Photographer ".
 Miriam Nader, "The Governor General’s Awards: Iconic Creators", Canadian Art, 28 February 2012.
 "Geoffrey James receives Governor General's Award", Ryerson University Faculty of Communication & Design, February 28, 2012

1942 births
Living people
Canadian photographers
Governor General's Award in Visual and Media Arts winners
Members of the Royal Canadian Academy of Arts